The Irish League in season 1956–57 comprised 12 teams, and Glenavon won the championship.

League standings

Results

References
Northern Ireland - List of final tables (RSSSF)

NIFL Premiership seasons
1956–57 in Northern Ireland association football
North